Jianghan Road Station, is an interchange station on Line 2 and Line 6 of the Wuhan Metro. It entered revenue service on December 28, 2012. It is located in Jianghan District.

This station was sponsored by Zhouheiya, but the sponsorship has ended.

Station layout

Gallery

References

Wuhan Metro stations
Line 2, Wuhan Metro
Line 6, Wuhan Metro
Railway stations in China opened in 2012
Jianghan District